Cantelowes was a ward in the London Borough of Camden, in the United Kingdom. The ward was created for the May 2002 local elections and covers an area between Kentish Town Road and York Way.

The population of the ward at the 2011 Census was 11,925. The ward was abolished for the 2022 election. Most of its area became part of the newly created Camden Square and Kentish Town South wards, with a small area becoming part of the Camden Town ward.

References

Former wards of the London Borough of Camden
2002 establishments in England
2022 disestablishments in England